The Public Library of Enid and Garfield County, founded in 1899, is a public library located in Enid, Oklahoma, the county seat of Garfield County, Oklahoma.

The library began as a one-room library sponsored by the Enid Study Club in 1899. In 1905, the city of Enid acquired the library, and in 1908 received a grant from the Andrew Carnegie Foundation to build a Carnegie library. The Enid Carnegie Library was a Mission Revival style building designed by A. A. Crowell and built by DC Bass and Sons Construction. It was located at 402 N. Independence, and was in operation from August 1, 1910, until 1964. Following years of vacancy, the Carnegie library was demolished in 1972, and is now a vacant lot. On October 18, 1964, a new mid-century modern style building was opened at 120 W. Maine, the library's current location. In 2010, the library underwent renovations modeled after the San Jose Public Library System.  The library building was listed on the National Register of Historic Places in 2015.

Gallery

See also
National Register of Historic Places listings in Garfield County, Oklahoma
List of Carnegie libraries in Oklahoma

References

Buildings and structures in Enid, Oklahoma
Carnegie libraries in Oklahoma
Public libraries in Oklahoma
Education in Garfield County, Oklahoma
Library buildings completed in 1910
Libraries on the National Register of Historic Places in Oklahoma
National Register of Historic Places in Garfield County, Oklahoma